Librantice is a municipality and village in Hradec Králové District in the Hradec Králové Region of the Czech Republic. It has about 600 inhabitants.

History
The first written mention of Librantice is from 1496.

References

External links

Villages in Hradec Králové District